Joseph H. Brown Elementary School is an elementary school on Frankford Avenue at Stanwood Street in Holmesburg, in the Northeast Philadelphia area of Philadelphia, Pennsylvania, currently serving students from kindergarten to sixth grade. It is part of the School District of Philadelphia.

The current school building was constructed in 1937, replacing an earlier building on the same site. The school building was designed by Irwin T. Catharine, then the Philadelphia School District's main architect, and is an exemplar of the Art Deco and Moderne schools of architecture.

School uniforms
Brown students are required to wear school uniforms.

History

Before 1973, J.H. Brown included grades K through 8. With the opening of Austin Meehan Middle School, grades 7 and 8 were moved from Brown School.

Principals:
 Ruth Brown  to 1978
 Sarah Peters to 1987
 Kara Teachous to 1999
 Ellen Denofa to 2010

Joseph Brown students go on to Austin Meehan Middle.

All persons assigned to Meehan are zoned to Abraham Lincoln High School.

References

External links
 Joseph H. Brown School

Educational institutions established in 1937
Public elementary schools in Philadelphia
School District of Philadelphia
Moderne architecture in Pennsylvania
School buildings on the National Register of Historic Places in Philadelphia
Holmesburg, Philadelphia
1937 establishments in Pennsylvania